The University Centre of the Westfjords (Icelandic: Háskólasetur Vestfjarða) is a higher education institute located in Ísafjörður, Iceland. It offers integrated master's programmes in Coastal and Marine Management, Marine Innovation and Regional Development, in cooperation with the University of Akureyri, as well as courses in Icelandic language.

History
The centre was established on 12 March 2005 in Ísafjörður, a town of circa 3,000 inhabitants on the western coast of Iceland. Its first and only director to date is Peter Weiss.

References

External links
Official site

Universities in Iceland
Educational institutions established in 2005
2005 establishments in Iceland